Anthem is a single released in August 1997 by The Wildhearts, on the Mushroom Records Label.  It was the first Wildhearts single to be released on multiple formats (Formats: CD1 (MUSH6CD), CD2 (MUSH6CDX), 7" Vinyl (MUSH6S)) with different b-sides on each format, which caused some uproar at the time from longtime fans of the band.  It reached number 21 on the UK chart.

The single was the first from the controversial album Endless, Nameless and the first officially released Wildhearts song to feature someone other than Ginger on lead vocals, in this case bassist Danny McCormack.

CD1
 Anthem
 So Good To Be Back Home
 Time To Let You Go

CD2
 Anthem
 White Lies
 The Song Formally Known As?

7"
 Anthem
 He's A Whore

 

The Wildhearts songs
1997 songs